Scandium(III) fluoride, ScF3, is an ionic compound.  This salt is slightly soluble in water but dissolves in the presence of excess fluoride to form the ScF63− anion.

Production
ScF3 can be produced by reacting scandium and fluorine. It is also formed during the extraction from the ore thortveitite by the reaction of Sc2O3 with  ammonium bifluoride at high temperature:
 Sc2O3 + 6 NH4HF2 → 2 ScF3 + 6 NH4F + 3 H2O

The resulting mixture contains a number of metal fluorides and this is reduced by reaction with calcium metal at high temperature. Further purification steps are required to produce usable metallic scandium.

Properties
Scandium trifluoride exhibits the unusual property of negative thermal expansion, meaning it shrinks when heated. This phenomenon is explained by the quartic oscillation of the fluoride ions. The energy stored in the bending strain of the fluoride ion is proportional to the fourth power of the displacement angle, unlike most other materials where it is proportional to the square of the displacement. A fluorine atom is bound to two scandium atoms, and as temperature increases the fluorine oscillates more perpendicularly to its bonds. This motion draws the scandium atoms together throughout the bulk material, which contracts.  ScF3 exhibits this property from at least 10 K to 1100 K above which it shows the normal positive thermal expansion; furthermore, the material has cubic symmetry over this entire temperature range, and up to at least 1600 K at ambient pressure. The negative thermal expansion at very low temperatures is quite strong (coefficient of thermal expansion around -14 ppm/K between 60 and 110 K).

At ambient pressures scandium trifluoride adopts the cubic crystal system, using the perovskite structure with one metal position vacant. The unit cell dimension is 4.01 Å. Under pressure scandium trifluoride also forms different crystal structures with rhombohedral, and above 3 GPa tetrahedral.

References

Scandium compounds
Fluorides
Metal halides